Charles Pierre Gaston Napoléon Deschamps (5 January 1861 – 15 May 1931) was a French archaeologist, writer and journalist.

After he joined the École normale supérieure in 1882, Deschamps was appointed a member of the French School at Athens in 1885. He conducted archaeologic excavations in Amorgos, Chios and in Anatolia.

Selected publications 
1896: Le Chemin fleuri, récit de voyages. Paris, Calmann-Lévy.
1892: La Grèce d’aujourd’hui, Paris, A. Colin, 1892. Work crowned by the Académie française.
1894: Sur les routes d’Asie, Paris, A. Colin.
1894–1900: La Vie et les livres, Paris, A. Colin et cie.
1899: Le Malaise de la démocratie, Paris, A. Colin.
1906: Le Rythme de la vie, Paris, A. Colin.

Sources 
 Henri Avenel, La Presse française au vingtième siècle, Paris, É. Flammarion, 1901, (p. 206).

External links 
Gaston Deschamps on data.bnf.fr
List of publications on Persée

French archaeologists
20th-century French writers
19th-century French journalists
Academic staff of the Collège de France
Members of the French School at Athens
École Normale Supérieure alumni
People from Deux-Sèvres
1861 births
1931 deaths